Larson Glacier is a tributary glacier that drains northwest from La Gorce Peak in the Alexandra Mountains of Antarctica and enters the south side of Butler Glacier, on Edward VII Peninsula. It was mapped by the United States Geological Survey from surveys and U.S. Navy air photos, 1959–65, and was named by the Advisory Committee on Antarctic Names for helicopter pilot Lieutenant Commander Conrad S. Larson, U.S. Navy, officer in charge of the helicopter detachment aboard the icebreaker  during Operation Deep Freeze, 1955–56.

See also
 List of glaciers in the Antarctic
 Glaciology

References

External links
 The Papers of Conrad S. Larson at Dartmouth College Library

Glaciers of King Edward VII Land